Minatitlán Municipality may refer to:
 Minatitlán Municipality, Colima
 Minatitlán Municipality, Veracruz (Minatitlán, Veracruz)

Municipality name disambiguation pages